Vernon E. "Skip" McCain (June 4, 1908 – April 5, 1993) was an American football and basketball coach and mathematics professor. He served as the head football coach at Maryland State College—now known as the University of Maryland Eastern Shore—from 1948 to 1963, compiling a record of 100–21–5. McCain was inducted into the College Football Hall of Fame in 2006.

McCain was born in Marietta, Oklahoma. He played college football as a quarterback at Langston University in 1930. Prior to being hired at Maryland State in 1948, McCain was an assistant coach at Tennessee Agricultural & Industrial State College—now known as Tennessee State University. He died on April 5, 1993, at his home in Oxon Hill, Maryland.

Head coaching record

Football

References

External links
 
 

1908 births
1993 deaths
American football quarterbacks
Langston Lions football players
Maryland Eastern Shore Hawks athletic directors
Maryland Eastern Shore Hawks football coaches
Maryland Eastern Shore Hawks men's basketball coaches
Tennessee State Tigers football coaches
College Football Hall of Fame inductees
University of Maryland Eastern Shore faculty
People from Marietta, Oklahoma
Coaches of American football from Oklahoma
Players of American football from Oklahoma
Basketball coaches from Oklahoma
African-American coaches of American football
African-American players of American football
African-American basketball coaches
20th-century African-American sportspeople